6th SDFCS Awards
December 18, 2001

Best Film: 
 Ghost World 
The 6th San Diego Film Critics Society Awards, given by the San Diego Film Critics Society on 18 December 2001, honored the best in film for 2001.

Winners
Best Actor: 
Guy Pearce - Memento
Best Actress: 
Thora Birch - Ghost World
Best Cinematography: 
The Man Who Wasn't There - Roger Deakins
Best Director: 
Terry Zwigoff - Ghost World
Best Film: 
Ghost World
Best Foreign Language Film: 
Amélie (Le fabuleux destin d'Amélie Poulain) • France
Best Production Design: 
Moulin Rouge! - Catherine Martin
Best Screenplay - Adapted: 
Ghost World - Daniel Clowes and Terry Zwigoff
Best Screenplay - Original: 
Donnie Darko - Richard Kelly
Best Supporting Actor: 
Ben Kingsley - Sexy Beast
Best Supporting Actress: 
Naomi Watts - Mulholland Drive
Body of Work Award: 
Steve Buscemi

References

2
2001 film awards
2001 in American cinema